Sky Bishkek was a regional airline based in Bishkek, Kyrgyzstan. Its main base was Manas International Airport.

Destinations
Sky Bishkek served the following domestic destinations:
Batken – Batken Airport
Bishkek – Manas International Airport base
Osh – Osh Airport

Fleet

The Sky Bishkek fleet included the following aircraft:

References

External links

Defunct airlines of Kyrgyzstan
Airlines established in 2012